In mathematics, more specifically in abstract algebra, the Frobenius theorem, proved by Ferdinand Georg Frobenius in 1877, characterizes the finite-dimensional associative division algebras over the real numbers.  According to the theorem, every such algebra is isomorphic to one of the following:
  (the real numbers)
  (the complex numbers)
  (the quaternions).

Proof
The main ingredients for the following proof are the Cayley–Hamilton theorem and the fundamental theorem of algebra.

Introducing some notation
 Let  be the division algebra in question.
 We can consider  as a finite-dimensional -vector space.
 For any  in  define the following real quadratic polynomial:

The claim
The key to the argument is the following

Claim. Moreover  as -vector spaces, which implies that  generates  as an algebra.

By the fundamental theorem of algebra, we can write

We can rewrite  in terms of the polynomials :

The first case implies that  is real. Because  has the same complex roots as the minimal polynomial and because it is real it follows that

Therefore, we read from the above equation we have:  if and only if , in other words  if and only if .

In particular, it is a vector subspace.

The finish
For  in  define . Because of the identity , it follows that  is real.

Let  be a subspace of  that generates  as an algebra and which is minimal with respect to this property. Then orthonormality implies that:

If , it has been shown above that  is generated by  subject to the relations 

If , then  cannot be a division algebra. Assume that . Let . It is easy to see that  (this only works if ). If  were a division algebra,  implies , which in turn means:  and so  generate .

Remarks and related results
Also note that  is not a -algebra.
 Pontryagin variant.

References
 Ray E. Artz (2009) Scalar Algebras and Quaternions, Theorem 7.1 "Frobenius Classification", page 26.
 Ferdinand Georg Frobenius (1878) "Über lineare Substitutionen und bilineare Formen", Journal für die reine und angewandte Mathematik 84:1–63 (Crelle's Journal). Reprinted in Gesammelte Abhandlungen Band I, pp. 343–405.
 Yuri Bahturin (1993) Basic Structures of Modern Algebra, Kluwer Acad. Pub. pp. 30–2  .
 Leonard Dickson (1914) Linear Algebras, Cambridge University Press. See §11 "Algebra of real quaternions; its unique place among algebras", pages 10 to 12.
 R.S. Palais (1968) "The Classification of Real Division Algebras" American Mathematical Monthly 75:366–8.
 Lev Semenovich Pontryagin, Topological Groups, page 159, 1966.

Algebras
Quaternions
Theorems about algebras
Articles containing proofs